Kerala State Co-operative Consumers’ Federation Limited (Consumerfed) is the apex body of the consumer Co-operatives in the state of Kerala, India . It is a co operative apex organization in Kerala started in 1965 . Its Head Quarters is at Kochi.

External links
Consumerfed

References 

Companies based in Kochi
Cooperatives in Kerala
1965 establishments in Kerala
Indian companies established in 1965